KOKO-FM is a radio station licensed to Kerman, California. Owned by Art Laboe's Big Broadcasting, it broadcasts a rhythmic oldies format targeting Fresno.

History
KOKO-FM originally signed on the air April 16, 1990, as country station KTAA and was owned by Barnard Broadcasting A California Limited Partnership during the early 1990s. In the early 1990s, the station flipped to a short-lived hip-hop format as Jammin 94, before flipping to regional Mexican La Fiesta. In 1997, the station was acquired by Hispanic Radio Enterprise Inc., and flipped to a rhythmic format as 94.3 The Party. In 1998, Art Laboe acquired the station and it was rebranded as Power 94, and later Hit Radio 94.3 in August 2001. This was then followed by a rhythmic AC format.

On June 28, 2012, KOKO-FM flipped to classic hits. On November 27, 2018, KOKO-FM again changed formats, this time to rhythmic oldies as Jammin' 94.3.

References

External links

OKO
Rhythmic oldies radio stations in the United States
Radio stations established in 1990
1990 establishments in California